Paymentwall Inc. is a payment service provider which services businesses in the SaaS, travel, and e-commerce industries.

History

Honor Gunday and Vladimir Kovalyov started Paymentwall in April 2010 to help game companies on Facebook monetize their global traffic.

On July 1, 2011, Facebook announced that they would no longer allow any outside monetization providers, at which point the company pivoted to providing services to non-Facebook games and online dating websites.

In 2011, the company entered into partnership with Alipay, a third-party mobile and online payment platform, established in Hangzhou, China in February 2004 by the Alibaba Group.

Paymentwall launched a payment system for Smart TVs in November 2014.

In 2018, Paymentwall spun out Terminal3 as a global payment platform for gaming companies.

Offices 

Paymentwall is headquartered in San Francisco, with offices in Berlin, Bangalore, Beijing, Gurgaon, Hanoi, Kyiv, Lisbon, London, Moscow, Manila, Seoul, Shenzhen, Cairo and Sofia.

In November 2015, the company unveiled its intergalactic-themed development lab in Kyiv.

In July 2019, the company officially announced its two new office locations in Bangalore and Gurgaon.

References

Further reading
 

Web applications
Financial services companies established in 2010
Payment systems
Merchant services
2010 establishments in California